William D. Coleman (November 26, 1915 - October 22, 2001) was the first Principal of the Andhra Christian Theological College, Hyderabad.  Coleman was born in India in Rajahmundry, Andhra Pradesh.

When four theological colleges came together to start Andhra Christian Theological College in Rajahmundry, William D. Coleman was installed as the Principal of the College in 1964.

The Andhra Christian Theological College comprised faculty from four previous entities:
 Andhra Union Theological Seminary, Dornakal
 Baptist Theological Seminary, Kakinada
 Lutheran Theological College, Rajahmundry
 Ramayapatnam Baptist Theological Seminary, Ramayapatnam

W. D. Coleman worked in an ecumenical environment together with Baptists, Lutherans, Anglicans, and Wesleyans.  It was Coleman who supervised the relocation of the College from Rajahmundry to Hyderabad as well as establishing the new campus in Hyderabad, especially during the Licence Raj.

Studies

Scholastic and collegiate
Coleman studied up to twelfth standard at the Kodaikanal International School, Dundigal in Tamil Nadu (India) and proceeded to the United States where he pursued a graduate degree in arts at the Muhlenberg College, Allentown in Pennsylvania from where he obtained a B.A. in 1936.

Graduate and postgraduate
In fall 1936, Coleman enrolled at the Lutheran Theological Seminary at Philadelphia in Philadelphia for a graduate course in spirituality leading to B.D.  Coleman studied at the seminary during the Registrarship of The Rev. Frederic Whipp Friday and completed his studies by 1939 and was ordained the same year and returned to India for Christian mission service.

During 1946-1948, Coleman went to the United States where he again enrolled at his alma mater, the Lutheran Theological Seminary at Philadelphia and submitted a dissertation fulfilling the requirements for the Bachelor of Divinity course based on which the seminary awarded him a B.D. degree in 1947.

In fall 1946, Coleman enrolled for a postgraduation course leading to S.T.M. at the Lutheran Theological Seminary at Philadelphia where he spent two semesters studying under Frederick Nolde, Roswell P. Barnes, Henry Smith Leiper, Franklin Clark Fry, and other faculty.  Coleman also attended two additional seminars in 1947-1948 and was able to submit a dissertation entitled The Doctrine of Incarnation in Hinduism and Christianity based on which the seminary awarded him with an S.T.M. degree in 1948.

Doctoral
During 1953-1954, Coleman pursued doctoral studies at the Yale Divinity School and the Hartford Seminary, Hartford, Connecticut where he wrote a thesis titled, The Development of the Indigenous Church in the Andhra Area in India on the Background of Hinduism, leading to the award of Ph.D. by the Hartford Seminary.

Ecclesiastical ministry
After initial theological studies in the United States, Coleman returned to India in 1939 and began serving as Missionary of the Andhra Evangelical Lutheran Church.

Pastoral
After Coleman returned to India in 1940, he was given the role of District Missionary in Bheemavaram and Narsapur Fields of the Andhra Evangelical Lutheran Church which he served from 1941-1946.  After a two-year gap, Coleman was assigned as Evangelistic Missionary in the East Godavari Synod during 1948-1953.

Spiritual Formator

1952-1964
In 1952, Coleman was taken on the teaching staff of the Lutheran Theological College in Rajahmundry and also continued his role as an Evangelistic Missionary in the East Godavari Synod up to 1953.  Coleman taught for more than a decade from 1952-1964 and also became Principal of the Lutheran Theological College in 1962.

1964-1981
When ecumenical efforts fructified resulting in the formation of the Andhra Christian Theological College in 1964 in the erstwhile premises of the Lutheran Theological College, Coleman was chosen as the Principal of the College, a position in which he continued up to 1973 in Rajahmundry.

In 1973, when the College was relocated to Hyderabad, Coleman continued to teach at the College and was Dean of External Studies from 1974-1981.

Retirement and death
Coleman resigned from the College in 1981 and took up a role with the Division of World Mission and Ecumenism of the Evangelical Lutheran Church in America and was stationed in New York during 1981-1982.  After serving for a year, Coleman retired from the Evangelical Lutheran Church in America.

After leading a retired life for nearly 18 years', Coleman died on 22 October 2001 at Colebrook, Pennsylvania (United States of America).

Reminisce
Talathoti Punnaiah who studied a 3-year theology course leading to Bachelor of Theology at the Andhra Christian Theological College, both at Rajahmundry and at Hyderabad from 1970-1973 recalls his association with W. D. Coleman,

References

Further reading
 

Telugu people
People from Rajahmundry
Indian biblical scholars
Andhra Pradesh academics
Editors of Christian publications
20th-century Lutheran clergy
Indian Christian theologians
Leaders of Christian parachurch organizations
Lutheran sermon writers
Lutheran writers
20th-century Indian translators
2001 deaths
Old Testament scholars
Academic staff of the Senate of Serampore College (University)
1915 births
Writers from Andhra Pradesh
People from East Godavari district
Indian emigrants to the United States
Lutheran biblical scholars